William Henry Atkinson (born 14 October 1988) is an English professional footballer who plays as a midfielder for  club Boston United.

Having begun his professional career with Hull City in 2006, Atkinson spent time on loan with Port Vale, Mansfield Town, Rochdale (twice), Rotherham United and Plymouth Argyle. He was promoted out of League Two with Rochdale in 2009–10. He signed with Bradford City in July 2012, and played in the 2013 League Cup final defeat and the 2013 League Two play-off final victory. He signed with Southend United in July 2013, and helped the club to win the 2015 League Two play-off final. He signed with Mansfield Town in May 2017. He signed a short-term deal with Port Vale in October 2019, remaining at the club until the end of the 2019–20 season. He signed with Southend United in August 2021 after spending the curtailed 2020–21 season with Alfreton Town. He joined Boston United in June 2022.

Career

Hull City
Born in Driffield, East Riding of Yorkshire, Atkinson started his career as a trainee with Hull City. In December 2006, at the age of eighteen, he penned a two-and-a-half-year professional deal with the club.

In October 2007, he joined caretaker-manager Dean Glover's Port Vale in League One for a six-week loan period. He made his senior debut on 13 October, in a 1–0 defeat by Brighton & Hove Albion at Vale Park. Fourteen days later he won his first start, in a 2–1 win over Swindon Town. He made a total of four appearances for the "Valiants" before returning to Hull after Lee Sinnott replaced Glover as manager. Upon his return he made one substitute appearance for Hull, in an FA Cup defeat to Plymouth Argyle on 5 January. Later in the month he joined League Two Mansfield Town on a one-month loan. Mansfield manager Bill Dearden later extended the deal into a further month, and handed Atkinson a total of ten starts and two substitute appearances. He had a quiet 2008–09, not joining any clubs on loan and not making an appearance for the Hull City first team, as the "Tigers" enjoyed their maiden season in the Premier League.

He made his League Cup bow on 25 August 2009, and was replaced by Kevin Kilbane 73 minutes into a 3–1 win over Southend United. In November he joined Rochdale on a month long loan. The loan was extended after the team went unbeaten in his six games at the club. This run included a 3–0 win over Macclesfield Town on 5 December, in which Atkinson scored his first senior goal. Though he returned before the end of the season, his efforts in his fifteen appearances helped Rochdale to win automatic promotion into League One. Upon his return to Hull he won his first start for the club in the Premier League clash with Wigan Athletic at the DW Stadium on 3 May. He marked this landmark appearance with a headed goal, though by this point Hull's relegation was confirmed. Six days later he played in the club's last game of the season, helping them to earn a respectable point at home to Liverpool.

He was selected for four Championship games at the start of 2010–11, before he signed for Rotherham United on loan deadline day (25 November). He played just three games, but did find the net in a 5–0 demolition of former club Port Vale. In January 2011, Atkinson decided to rejoin Rochdale on loan for the end of the season, after turning down the opportunity for extending his United loan. He went on to make 21 appearances for "Dale", finding the net twice.

In August 2011, he joined Plymouth Argyle on loan for the entirety of the 2011–12 season. He scored the opening goal on his debut against Rotherham United and at the beginning of September at Burton Albion. Atkinson netted two more goals in November, against Torquay United and Northampton Town respectively. Atkinson was recalled by Hull City in January 2012, having made 25 appearances in all competitions for Argyle.

Bradford City
In January 2012, he signed on loan with Bradford City until the end of the season. He scored his first goal for the "Bantams" on 28 February, in a 4–0 win over Barnet at Underhill. In July 2012 he signed a one-year contract with Bradford City. On 11 August, he made his first appearance since signing permanently, in a 1–0 win over Notts County at Meadow Lane. He scored his first goal of the season on 3 November, opening the scoring in a 1–1 draw away to Northampton Town in the first round of the FA Cup. He scored his second goal of the season in the replay on 13 November which finished 3–3, and also scored his penalty in the resulting shoot-out which Bradford won 4–2. On 12 February 2013, he scored his first league goal of the season in a 3–0 win away to Wycombe Wanderers. Having played in all seven matches of Bradford's run to the 2013 final of the League Cup, including victories over Premier League sides Wigan Athletic, Arsenal and Aston Villa, he played at Wembley in the 5–0 defeat to Swansea City. He was a 78th-minute substitute in the play-off final victory over Northampton Town.

Southend United

In July 2013, Atkinson signed a two-year contract with Southend United, reuniting him with his former Hull City boss, Phil Brown. He was an ever-present in the league for the "Shrimpers" in the 2013–14 season, and helped the club to secure a play-off spot, where they were beaten by Burton Albion at the semi-final stage. He was a first team regular in the 2014–15 campaign as United again secured a play-off place, and played the first 80 minutes of the play-off final as Southend beat Wycombe Wanderers to win promotion into League One. He signed a new two-year contract in June 2015, and went on to make 39 appearances in the 2015–16 campaign as Southend posted a 15th-place finish. Atkinson scored four goals in 41 games in the 2016–17 season as United finished in seventh place, one place and one point outside the play-offs. He scored two of these goals in a 3–0 win over former club Bradford City at Roots Hall on 19 November, which earned himself a place on the EFL team of the week. He chose to leave the club in the summer after feeling that he "wasn't made to feel valued or wanted by Southend".

Mansfield Town
On 30 May 2017, Atkinson joined EFL League Two club Mansfield Town as manager Steve Evans's 11th summer signing. He was transfer-listed by Mansfield at the end of the 2017–18 season. However he remained at Field Mill and was praised by manager David Flitcroft for his contribution as a squad player during the 2018–19 season, before being released in May 2019.

Port Vale
On 4 October 2019, Atkinson signed a short-term deal with Port Vale, 12 years after he briefly played for the club on loan. He was signed by manager John Askey following injuries to Tom Conlon and Manny Oyeleke, leaving him to compete with Luke Joyce, Jake Taylor, Scott Burgess and Ryan Lloyd for a place in central midfield. He was up to match fitness after having spent a full pre-season training with Doncaster Rovers. He made his "second debut" for the club the following day, playing at right-back in a 3–1 home win over Morecambe, and in doing so set a club record for the longest time between appearances as his previous game for the club came 11 years and 11 months earlier. He scored his first goal for the club on 22 October, when his injury-time strike secured a 2–1 victory over former club Bradford City at Valley Parade. In January 2020, he signed an extended deal to keep him at the club until the end of the 2019–20 season. However he was not retained at the end of the campaign.

Non-League
On 5 November 2020, Atkinson signed with National League North club Alfreton Town. He played 13 games before the 2019–20 season was curtailed due to the ongoing COVID-19 pandemic in England.

On 24 August 2021, Atkinson returned for a second spell at Southend United and in doing so reunited with former manager Phil Brown; he joined the National League club a short-term deal after impressing on trial. New manager Kevin Maher gave him a contract extension in January, praising Atkinson's work ethic and character. He played 35 matches in the 2021–22 campaign, but was not offered a new contract in the summer, much to his surprise.

On 28 June 2022, Atkinson returned to the National League North to join Boston United, with manager Paul Cox stating that "he was much sought after following his time at Southend and we are delighted to have him onboard".

Style of play
Atkinson is a central midfielder, but is versatile and can play at wide right, wing-back and right-back. Port Vale manager John Askey described him as "a good passer of the ball and an intelligent player."

Personal life
Atkinson's father, Kevin, director of Hull company Thermoplant Offshore Services, used to run his junior team in Brandesburton. He has two sisters: Rachel and Frances.

Career statistics

Honours
Rochdale
League Two third-place promotion: 2009–10

Bradford City
League Cup runner-up: 2012–13
League Two play-offs: 2013

Southend United
League Two play-offs: 2015

References

External links

1988 births
Living people
People from Driffield
Footballers from the East Riding of Yorkshire
English footballers
Association football midfielders
Hull City A.F.C. players
Port Vale F.C. players
Mansfield Town F.C. players
Rochdale A.F.C. players
Rotherham United F.C. players
Plymouth Argyle F.C. players
Bradford City A.F.C. players
Alfreton Town F.C. players
Southend United F.C. players
Boston United F.C. players
Premier League players
English Football League players
National League (English football) players